Galia Lahav is a fashion label established in 1984 in Tel Aviv. It was founded by fashion designer Galia Lahav. The brand is primarily known for its bridal and evening wear. In January 2017, it became the first Israeli brand to be accepted by the Chambre Syndicale de la Haute Couture and to present in Paris Fashion Week. As of 2019, the brand is represented by 70 stores across 40 countries. Singer Beyoncé wore a Galia Lahav bridal gown to renew her vows.

History

Galia Lahav was born in Pinsk, Belarus. Lahav emigrated with her family to Israel in 1957, and grew up in southern Israel, in the city of Ashkelon. In 2005, after operating for more than 2 decades in the Israeli market, Galia's son, Idan Lahav, had joined the company as the CEO and helped expand the company's operations to the international market. In a Forbes interview, Lahav shared how technology and data-driven approach has helped the brand penetrate the global arena. "Galia Lahav continues to look to the paradoxes of the connected consumer to guide its data-driven, creative-centric approach, forging innovative inroads deeper into the ever-expanding social worlds of the most demanding (and fashionable) of all connected consumers."

Notable clients and projects
Galia Lahav dresses worn by

Flagship stores
Galia Lahav opened its first Flagship store in Tel Aviv, Israel. Following this, claiming "Bridal Reflections", in New York City, their flagship store. In 2016, Galia Lahav opened the doors to two flagship stores, one in Los Angeles, located on La Brea and the second located in Hamburg, Germany, being the brand's first European Flagship store 

In 2019, Galia Lahav opened their 5th Flagship store in Shanghai, China, being their first flagship location in Asia. "The 1,000-square-meter store cost $3 million to fit out and is one of the largest tenancies in the luxury BFC shopping Center." In 2020, the brand opened their 6th Flagship store in Miami, Florida.

References

External links 

Luxury brands
Lahav, Galia
Lahav, Galia
Lahav, Galia
Clothing companies of Israel